Henry Thillberg (17 August 1930 – 6 February 2022) was a Swedish footballer who played his entire career at Malmö FF as a midfielder. In 1961, he gave up soccer. He died from heart failure on 6 February 2022, at the age of 91.

References

External links

1930 births
2022 deaths
Swedish footballers
Association football midfielders
Sweden international footballers
Allsvenskan players
Malmö FF players